FirstEnergy Corp is an electric utility headquartered in Akron, Ohio. It was established when Ohio Edison acquired Centerior Energy in 1997. Its subsidiaries and affiliates are involved in the distribution, transmission, and generation of electricity, as well as energy management and other energy-related services. Its ten electric utility operating companies comprise one of the United States' largest investor-owned utilities, based on serving 6 million customers within a  area of Ohio, Pennsylvania, West Virginia, Virginia, Maryland, New Jersey, and New York. Its generation subsidiaries control more than 16,000 megawatts of capacity, and its distribution lines span over 194,000 miles. In 2018, FirstEnergy ranked 219 on the Fortune 500 list of the largest public corporations in the United States by revenue.

In November 2016, FirstEnergy made the decision to exit the competitive power business, and become a fully regulated company.

On July 21, 2020, Speaker of the Ohio House of Representatives, Larry Householder, former Ohio Republican Party Chairman Matt Borges, and three others were accused of accepting $60 million in bribes from FirstEnergy in exchange for $1.3 billion worth of benefits in the form of Ohio House Bill 6, as part of what became known as the Ohio nuclear bribery scandal. The stock price of the company plummeted within hours of the arrests being made. On July 22, 2021, the U.S. Attorney for the Southern District of Ohio announced that FirstEnergy would be fined $230 million for their part in the scandal. Vipal Patel, the acting U.S. Attorney, said that this was the largest criminal fine ever collected by the Southern District.

History

Ohio Edison
Ohio Edison Company (formerly OEC on the NYSE) was a publicly traded holding company that began in 1930 from the consolidation of 200 electric companies.  By 1950, it ended up with two utility operating companies, Pennsylvania Power and Ohio Edison.  It continued in existence until 1997, when its merger with Centerior formed FirstEnergy.

Subsidiaries
 In 1944, the Pennsylvania Power Company became a subsidiary of Ohio Edison, and is now one of the ten operating utilities.
 In 1950, the Ohio Edison Company merged with the Ohio Public Service Company, which continued to operate under its new Ohio Edison name. It is now one of the ten FirstEnergy operating companies, and is the main power provider for northeastern Ohio outside of Cleveland itself.

Centerior

Centerior Energy Corporation (formerly CX on the NYSE) was formed in 1986 from the merger of two old operating companies. Centerior was based in Independence, Ohio, and existed as a publicly traded holding company for ten years, until its merger with Ohio Edison formed FirstEnergy in 1997:

Cleveland Electric Illuminating Company, commonly known as The Illuminating Company, was a publicly traded operating company through 1986, until it merged with Toledo Edison to come under the control of Centerior. Having been acquired by 1929, by 1940 it had become one of ten major direct subsidiaries of North American Company, which in turn had been one of the original 12 stocks listed in the Dow Jones Industrial Average. It is one of two power companies serving Greater Cleveland, the other being city-owned Cleveland Public Power.
Toledo Edison Company (formerly TED on the NYSE) was a publicly traded utility operating company, until it merged to form Centerior in 1986. It is the main power provider for northwestern Ohio.

GPU
General Public Utilities (formerly GPU on the NYSE) was a publicly traded utility holding company in Parsippany, New Jersey. In 1996, the company was reorganized and renamed GPU, Inc. In 1996, it formed a new division as well, GPU Energy, which became the holding company for its three utility operating companies:

Jersey Central Power and Light (JCP&L, serving most of central and northwestern New Jersey)
Pennsylvania Electric Company (Penelec, serving northern and central Pennsylvania)
Metropolitan Edison (Met-Ed, serving eastern and south-central Pennsylvania)

In 2001, FirstEnergy Corporation, with its four utility operating companies, merged with GPU, Inc., bringing GPU's three additional operating companies into FirstEnergy as well.

Through the 2001 acquisition of GPU, FirstEnergy also acquired:
MYR Group (formerly MYR on the NYSE), a subsidiary that GPU had created as a publicly traded company in the 1996 reorganization, to  install and maintain utility power lines and cellular telephone communications towers.

GPU is best known as the former owner of the Three Mile Island nuclear plant.  In 1989, Standley H. Hoch, a former executive with General Dynamics, became the CEO of GPU.  Hoch had two main goals: cut costs; and fight to repeal the Public Utility Holding Company Act of 1935, which made it difficult for utilities to operate across state lines.

Allegheny Energy

Allegheny Energy was an electric utility serving customers in Pennsylvania, West Virginia, Virginia, and Maryland. Its regulated subsidiaries are West Penn Power (serving Southwestern and Central Pennsylvania), Monongahela Power (a.k.a. "Mon Power", serving Northern and Southern West Virginia), and The Potomac Edison Company (western and central Maryland, parts of eastern West Virginia, and northern Virginia). The electric generating plants are operated by subsidiary Allegheny Energy Supply Company and Monongahela Power.

Before the formation of Allegheny Energy, the holding company was known as Allegheny Power System which had the three utility operating units. The brand name Allegheny Power was used on customer bills, trucks and company equipment starting in 1996. In 1997, the company attempted to merge with Pittsburgh-based Duquesne Light Company. The merger was withdrawn by both parties and both companies did not merge. In 1999, Allegheny Power purchased the West Virginia operations of UtiliCorp United's West Virginia Power. UtiliCorp purchased Virginia Electric and Power Company's (present day Dominion Resources) West Virginia service area in 1986 and renamed the acquired service area West Virginia Power.

In February 2010, Allegheny Energy announced plans to merge with FirstEnergy. The merger was approved by stockholders of both companies, the Federal Energy Regulatory Commission, and regulatory commissions in Virginia, West Virginia, Maryland, and Pennsylvania.  It was finalized when the Pennsylvania Public Utilities Commission approved the merger on February 24, 2011; the merger closed on February 25, 2011. The merger does not include Allegheny's service area in Virginia, which was purchased in 2010 by the Shenandoah Valley Electric Cooperative and the Rappahannock Electric Cooperative.

After the merger with Allegheny Energy, FirstEnergy was the largest investor-owned electric utility in the country (based on customers served) for a short period, before the Exelon/Constellation and Duke Energy/Progress Energy mergers.

FirstEnergy Formation
FirstEnergy was formed on November 7, 1997, when Ohio Edison acquired Centerior Energy and its subsidiaries for $1.6 billion in stock. The company was acquired with plans for a restructuring and layoffs to cut costs. That same month the Public Utilities Commission of Ohio (PUCO) initiated an investigation into the reliability of FirstEnergy's energy transmission in the context of possible plant shutdowns and prior problems with Centerior.

Subsequent mergers
In 2001, FirstEnergy merged with GPU, Inc., the owner of Jersey Central Power & Light Company, Pennsylvania Electric Company (Penelec), and Metropolitan Edison Company (Met-Ed).

FirstEnergy would later merge with Greensburg, Pennsylvania-based Allegheny Energy in 2011.

Bankruptcy of FirstEnergy Solutions
On March 31, 2018, FirstEnergy Solutions filed for bankruptcy. FirstEnergy Solutions was a generation subsidiary, and FirstEnergy itself remains solvent. The case is being closely watched as it could have significant implications for the U.S. power sector, as the U.S. Bankruptcy Court for the Northern District of Ohio has asserted its primacy over the Federal Energy Regulatory Commission (FERC) relating to certain FirstEnergy Solutions FERC-regulated power purchase agreements.

The Company filed its eighth amended bankruptcy plan on October 14, 2019. In 2020, it emerged from bankruptcy, becoming Energy Harbor Corp.

Proposed power plant closures and bailout
In March, 2018, FirstEnergy announced it is closing the Perry Nuclear Generating Station and Davis–Besse Nuclear Power Station, both in Ohio, and Beaver Valley Nuclear Power Station in Pennsylvania. This was followed in August 2018 with the announcement of the closure of two coal-fired plants, the W.H. Sammis Power Plant in Stratton, Ohio and the Bruce Mansfield Power Plant in Shippingport, Pennsylvania by June 2022.

However, the closure of the Perry, Davis–Besse, and Sammis plants were rescinded in July 2019 when the State of Ohio passed and signed into law a subsidy to support the Perry and Davis–Besse nuclear plants.

Bribery scandal

On July 21, 2020, Speaker of the Ohio House of Representatives, Larry Householder, former Ohio Republican Party Chairman Matt Borges, and three others were accused of accepting $60 million in bribes from FirstEnergy in exchange for $1.3 billion worth of benefits in the form of Ohio House Bill 6, which increased electricity rates and provided that money as a $150 million per year bailout for the two above-mentioned nuclear plants (Perry and Davis–Besse). The stock price of the company plummetted within hours of the arrests being made. First Energy denied involvement in the charges. State legislators quickly announced plans for a bill to repeal H.B. 6.

On October 19, 2020, The Independent Review Committee of the Board of Directors of FirstEnergy Corp. announced a leadership transition, including the termination of the company's Chief Executive Officer, Charles E. Jones, effective immediately. FirstEnergy today also announced the termination of two other executives: its Senior Vice President of Product Development, Marketing, and Branding; and its Senior Vice President of External Affairs, effective immediately. During the course of the company's previously disclosed internal review related to the government investigations, the Independent Review Committee of the Board determined that these executives violated certain FirstEnergy policies and its code of conduct.
Concurrently, Steven E. Strah, President of FirstEnergy, has been appointed Acting Chief Executive Officer, effective immediately.

On July 22, 2021, the U.S. Attorney for the Southern District of Ohio announced that FirstEnergy would be fined $230 million for their part in the scandal.

COVID-19 pandemic
During the COVID-19 pandemic in March 2020, the company stopped power shutoffs and restored connections for those whose power had been terminated because of non-payment. They also requested that customers who were facing hardship paying their utility bills contact the company to set up alternate payment programs, energy assistance programs or other energy arrangements, based on the customer's ability to pay. This included customers of all ten First Energy utility companies in six states.

Intent to exit non-regulated business
FirstEnergy announced its intent in November 2016 to exit the competitive businesses while staying in the regulated businesses and become a fully regulated company during the next 18 months. FirstEnergy Solutions, the company's competitive subsidiary, manages 13,000 MW of generating capacity and is a leading energy supplier serving residential, commercial and industrial customers in the Northeast, Midwest and Mid-Atlantic regions. It was anticipated that some generating units would be sold, and some would be shut down. Robert E. Murray, CEO of Murray Energy, warned in August 2017 that FirstEnergy Solutions was in danger of bankruptcy if an emergency order to open coal-fired plants was not issued by the White House. The Federal Energy Regulatory Commission (FERC) unanimously rejected a United States Department of Energy (DOE) Notice of Proposed Rulemaking (NOPR) to subsidize coal and nuclear plants in January 2018. FirstEnergy Solutions filed for Chapter 11 bankruptcy on March 31, 2018. As a result of the  bankruptcy, FirstEnergy Solutions sought federal intervention of invoking Section 202(c) of the Federal Power Act to keep their power plants operating.

In February 2018, FirstEnergy announced plans to deactivate or sell Pleasants Power Station in West Virginia.  In March 2018, FirstEnergy announced plans to deactivate or sell the Beaver Valley, Davis-Besse, and Perry nuclear power plants, which are in the Ohio and Pennsylvania deregulated electricity market, during the next three years.

FirstEnergy's electric generation is primarily from coal and nuclear power plants, but also includes natural gas, oil, and hydroelectric power plants.

Environmental record
A 2017 report conducted by the University of Massachusetts Amherst placed FirstEnergy 9 out of the top 100 of the country's largest greenhouse polluters.

FirstEnergy was required to pay $1.5 billion by 2011 as part of a settlement to end a lawsuit filed by the United States Environmental Protection Agency. This lawsuit alleged that the company failed to install pollution control equipment when upgrading its coal burning plants.  Also as part of the settlement, major pollution control equipment is now being installed at the FirstEnergy Sammis site and others. This lawsuit was one of the New Source Review lawsuits filed in the 1990s.

To provide cleaner energy to its customers, FirstEnergy took several important steps in 2009. First, the company announced plans in April to repower Units 4 and 5 at its R.E. Burger Power Station in Shadyside, Ohio, to generate electricity principally with biomass, the only base load renewable source that can displace coal emissions. Furthermore, FirstEnergy hosted a 1 MW pilot plant test of carbon capture retrofit equipment for carbon sequestration on one of the remaining coal units at the R.E. Burger. In September, FirstEnergy decided to complete construction on the Fremont Energy Center, a 707-MW natural-gas-fired peaking plant by the end of 2010. And finally in November, FirstEnergy purchased the rights to develop a compressed-air electric generating plant in Norton, Ohio, which Ohio Governor Ted Strickland praised as "an example of how we can leverage technology and our natural resources to grow our economy and ensure our energy future." The Norton project, part of the company's overall climate change strategy, has the potential to be expanded to up to 2,700 MW of capacity—the largest in the world by far. According to the Electric Power Research Institute, "a compressed-air energy storage project of this size...could be a key component in integrating large-scale intermittent renewables (such as wind) onto the nation's grid system."

FirstEnergy Solutions Corp. has also given renewable energy certificates to help balance out the amount of electricity used in Earth Day events that were held at nine post-secondary education locations in Maryland, New Jersey, Ohio, and Pennsylvania. Each of the schools received five SmartWind REC's, enough energy to light a large building for the entire day.

Energy efficiency became a state mandate in 2008 when lawmakers agreed with former Gov. Ted Strickland after months of debate to pass a law requiring electric utilities to help customers use less electricity every year—22 percent less by 2025 than they did in 2009. Under the 2008 law, FirstEnergy slaps companies that do not invest in energy efficiency with higher rates. But industries that use their waste heat to make power could escape that rate increase.

As of November 29, 2012 FirstEnergy Corp. has abandoned its behind-the-scene lobbying campaign to persuade lawmakers to gut a four-year-old law requiring utilities to help customers use less electricity by switching to energy efficient equipment and lighting.

Little Blue Run
Several cases have been brought against FirstEnergy for its dumping of coal waste into Little Blue Run Lake in West Virginia and Pennsylvania. FirstEnergy has dumped more than 20 billion gallons of coal ash and smokestack scrubber waste into the body of water which has contaminated local water supplies with arsenic, sulfates, sodium, calcium, magnesium and chloride.

A July 2012 consent decree from the Pennsylvania Department of Environmental Protection is forcing FirstEnergy to close the Little Blue Run Lake, an unlined waste impoundment in Beaver County, Pennsylvania and Hancock County, West Virginia. Coal ash waste slurry has been piped there from FirstEnergy's Bruce Mansfield Power Plant since 1974. The reservoir at Little Blue Run is the country's largest coal ash impoundment. Pollutants including sulfates, chlorides, and arsenic have been found in groundwater nearby. FirstEnergy must stop dumping coal ash at the site by 2016, pay a penalty of $800,000, provide clean water to local residents, and do environmental monitoring of seeps for toxic pollutants including selenium, boron, and arsenic.

Executives

Charles E. Jones was the president and chief executive officer of FirstEnergy from 2015 until his termination on October 29, 2020.

Steven E. Strah was named acting chief executive officer of FirstEnergy on October 29, 2020. Steven E. Strah decided to retire on September 16, 2022.

John Somerhalder is currently serving as interim CEO of FirstEnergy since September 17, 2022.

Notable accidents and incidents
The 2003 North American blackout was attributed mostly to FirstEnergy's failure to trim the trees around its high voltage lines in a certain sector of Ohio; heat and extreme power needs caused the lines to sag, coming into contact with the trees and causing flashover.
On Friday, January 20, 2006, FirstEnergy acknowledged a cover-up of serious safety violations by former workers at the Davis-Besse Nuclear Power Station, and accepted a plea bargain with the U.S. Department of Justice in lieu of possible federal criminal prosecution.  The plea bargain relates to the March 2002 discovery of severe corrosion in the pressure vessel of the nuclear reactor, contained within the plant's containment building.  In the agreement, the company agreed to pay fines of $23 million, with an additional $5 million to be contributed toward research on alternative energy sources and to Habitat for Humanity as well as to pay for costs related to the Federal investigation.  In addition, two former employees and one former contractor were indicted for purposely deceiving Nuclear Regulatory Commission (NRC) inspectors in multiple documents (including one videotape) over several years, hiding evidence that the reactor pressure vessel was being seriously corroded by boric acid.  The maximum penalty for the three is 25 years in prison.  The indictment also cites other employees as providing false information to inspectors, but does not name them.
In 2005, the NRC identified two earlier incidents at Davis-Besse as being among the top five events (excluding the actual disaster at Three Mile Island) most likely to have resulted in a nuclear disaster in the event of a subsequent failure.

See also 
 Grid connection
 Smart grid

References

External links
FirstEnergy Corp. Web site

 
Hydroelectric power companies of the United States
Natural gas companies of the United States
Nuclear power companies of the United States
Electric power companies of the United States
Corporate crime
Companies based in Akron, Ohio
American companies established in 1997
Non-renewable resource companies established in 1997
1997 establishments in Ohio
Defunct companies based in Cleveland
Companies in the Dow Jones Utility Average
Companies listed on the New York Stock Exchange